The Heroic Military College (officially in ) is the major military educational institution in Mexico. It was founded in 1823 and located in the former Palace of the Inquisition in Mexico City. Initially designated as the Cadet Academy, it was renamed in 1823 as the Colegio Militar. The college was relocated in Perote, Veracruz, before being returned to Mexico City, where it was established in the Betlemitas monastery (today occupied by the Interactive Museum of the Economy and the Museum of the Mexican Army and Air Force).  From 1835, the Military College was located in the Recogidas Building (destroyed by an earthquake in 1985). Cadets training for the Mexican Navy originally formed part of the student body, but in 1897, the Military Naval School was established as a separate institution in Veracruz.

The Military College comes under the supervision of the Mexican Army and Air Force University and the Army Military Education General Directorate.

History

Foundation
Although plans for a military academy were proposed as early as 1818, only in 1822 were such plans materialized, with the efforts of Diego Garcia Conde, the ex-Spanish military officer then serving in the Mexican Army, and then plans for such an academy to be formed were approved by the Mexican imperial government, through the Imperial War Ministry.

In the middle of the year, Emperor Agustin de Iturbide ordered that the  Former Inquisition Palace Complex become the headquarters of the now newly founded Military College of Mexico, the Military Cadet Academy, and the Engineers Training School, all under their first director, Brigadier Diego Garcia Conde. By the next year, through the orders of War Minister General Jose Joaquin de Herrera, the  Military College of Mexico was relaunched as a separate academy with headquarters at San Carlos Fortress, in Perote, Veracruz state. In 1824, in compliance with an order from President Guadalupe Victoria, 18 cadets of the now called Perote Military College of Mexico, through the permission of then college director Col. Juan Dominguez y Galvez,  became the first cadets of the new Naval Aspirants College and the Tlacotalpan Nautical School trained to be the Mexican Navy's future ship officers.

Early years
In 1828, due to a campaign against secret societies and Masonic lodges, Lt. Col. Manuel Montano's visit became the reason for the college's first loyalty act by the Corps of Cadets and its faculty, for their response to him was that the Military College should be exempted from the campaign because no one in the College's cadet rosters was either a secret society member nor Mason, and it turned into a national act of loyalty by the college cadets and faculty. As a result of this great deed, the college in March 1828 returned to Mexico City, first in the Bethelemitas convent and later in the Inquisition Palace Complex on July 1. By then, it began to be recognized by every Mexican as the nation's premier military educational institution.

The turmoil that sparked in the 1828 presidential elections took its toll on the College cadets. On September 11, a rebellion led by Generals Antonio Lopez de Santa Anna and Jose Maria Lobato  denounced the election results ten days before, in which Manuel Gomez Pedraza emerged as the winner. Two months later, on November 30, they together with Lorenzo de Zavala and Col. Santiago Garcia staged a coup d'état that took over the La  building demanding that the election results be voided by Congress. The same day, President Victoria called on the College cadets to proceed to the National Palace, and they fought on the side of the armed forces for 4 days until the fighting ended on December 4, with a compromise reached by both sides. Class resumed later the next day.

Political turmoil broke out again in 1840. On July 13 of that year Gen. Jose Urrea bolted out of jail and led a rebellion against President Anastacio Bustamante, who was later imprisoned in the presidential residence. General Gabriel Valencia then ordered all troops loyal to the President to proceed at once to the city citadel. These included the cadets of the Military College under its then director Brigade General Pedro Conde, who was received by Gen. Valencia and sent a delegation of cadets to the citadel. The College delegation then moved to a church where they fought anti-Bustamante troops, which resulted in two wounded cadets (Juan Rico and Antonio Groso), the former later died of his wounds sustained. On the 16th President Bustamante left his residence and Gen. Vicente Filisola arrived at the church premises. On that night, when an armistice was made, the attempted coup was already over.

The next year, it relocated to the Chalpultepec Castle in Mexico City. This castle was, in 6 years time, during the Mexican War, a place where 5 cadets and an officer in the faculty died in defense of the Mexican nation, and it gained the Heroic designation. After a few years, the College relocated to the Inquisition Palace and later to San Lucas.

In 1846, the College's only naval director, Graduate Ship Captain Francisco Garcia began his duties as College Commandant, a duty lasting until 1847. A sudden rebellion by the Corps of Cadets happened during his tenure.

The Niños Héroes

The following year (1847), during the first term of Col. José Mariano Monterde Segura as commandant, the Mexican–American War reached Mexico City and the Military Academy. On September 11 cadets of the Academy were involved in fighting on the Condress Estate.  On September 13 Chapultepec Castle and its surroundings became the site of the historic Battle of Chapultepec. Its Mexican Army defenders, under the leadership of Nicolás Bravo, former President of the Republic and a veteran of the war of independence, included about 200 members of the Corps of Cadets, aged between 13 and 19. At the end of the battle five cadets -  Juan Escutia (who reportedly leapt to his death wrapped in the Flag of Mexico), Agustin Melgar, Francisco Marquez, Fernando Montes de Oca, and Vicente Suárez; plus faculty member Lieutenant Juan de la Barrera - all refused to retreat and died in a final stand as the "young heroes" of Academy legend. An unknown proportion of the other cadets became casualties or prisoners during the earlier stages of the battle.

Each year on the anniversary of the battle, the sacrifice of the five Niños Héroes of the Military Academy is remembered nationwide, with a national ceremony at the monument with the Corps in attendance.

1857–1920
In 1858, during the term of Commandant Colonel Luis Tola Algarín, the College moved its facilities to the former Church of Sts. Peter and Paul in Mexico City.  During the Reform War the same year the Corps of Cadets was involved in a clash with the forces of Gen. Miguel Blanco on October 15 in Toluca. Casualties suffered by the cadets and instructors in this and subsequent actions caused the closure of the College in 1861.

The College was reopened in 1867. Located first in the National Palace the College was moved to various locations before returning to the Chapultepec Castle in 1882. Formerly a joint services institution, the College became an academy for the Mexican Army only in 1897, following the establishment of the Military Naval School in Veracruz.

On 8 February 1913 the 600 cadets of the Military College played a part in the coup known as The Ten Tragic Days against President Francisco Madero. Cadets of the separate Escuela Militar de Aspirantes de Tlalpan (established in 1905 as an additional academy for training junior officers) had joined with regular army units in an ultimately successful attempt to overthrow Madero. However a detachment of cadets from the Heroic Military College, acting on the orders of Deputy Commandant Lieutenant Colonel Víctor Hernández Covarrubias  escorted President Madero from Chapultepec Castle to the National Palace on the following day. Termed the Loyalty March, this action is still marked by an annual parade by the Corps of Cadets, attended by the present-day President of Mexico and his Cabinet.

The new government down-graded the role of the Heroic Military College, briefly merging its functions with those of the Escuela Militar de Aspirantes de Tlalpan and accelerating the training of cadets from both academies to reinforce the crumbling Federal Army. Following the overthrow of General Victoriano Huerta in July 1914 and the disbandment of the Federal Army, the College was closed. It was reestablished in February 1920 albeit in a new campus in Popotla, Mexico City. Later that spring the then reestablished cavalry squadron were involved in what has been termed "the final cavalry charge in the Americas". This occurred on May 8, when on the orders of Colonel Rodolfo Casillas the cadets acted in support of regular army dragoons led by General Pilar Sanchez under attack by rebel forces in Apizaco, Tlaxcala. In another engagement two days later a cadet was killed in action in San Marcos while supporting government forces.

The College from 1947 to today

In 1947 The Military College celebrated the centenary of the Corps of Cadets' participation in the Battle of Chapultepec, the finest hour of its history.  In 1949, the Congress of the Union formally conferred the "Heroic" designation to both the Corps and to the Midshipmen's Battalion of the Naval Military Academy, the latter for its role in resisting the United States occupation of Veracruz in 1914.

To celebrate the 150th anniversary of the Heroic Military College (1820-1970), 1 oz silver coins were minted by the Central Bank. In addition stamps featuring two Military College shakos were printed by the Government of Mexico. A special issue of stamps also commemorated the Golden Jubilee of "the final cavalry charge in the Americas"; carried out by the cavalry cadets of the college in 1920 (see above).

In 1976, the College's present campus in Tlalpan Borough, Mexico City, was formally opened, partially damaged by the 1985 earthquake that struck the city. Today, the commandant of the academy is Brigade General Julio Álvarez Arellano.

The school was used as a setting for Luis Miguel's 1989 music video "La Incondicional". In the video he plays an Air Force cadet who is in love, but he must take his studies as soldier seriously. In a marching scene towards the end of the song one can see the "Por el Honor de Mexico" banner.

Perote, the second home of the Military College, has been dubbed by the Veracruz State Congress as The Cradle of the Military College since 2002.

From 2007, the academy has accepted female cadets, first in support arms and later in the combat services and combat arms. The present Corps is regiment-sized and has among its units a cavalry squadron and an artillery battery, plus an armored cavalry training squadron raised recently - a first in a military academy in Latin America.

The celebrations of the Academy Biccentennial were marked beginning in 2021 given the COVID-19 pandemic in Mexico and will officially conclude in 2023.

In 2021, the Academy officially welcomed the first officer cadets of the National Guard studying for a officer's commission in that force.

Motto and Collegiate Slogan 
Por el Honor de Mexico (For Mexico's Honor) is the college motto, made in a contest organized by radio station XEQ in commemoration of the centenary of the defense of Chalpultepec Castle in 1947.

Every midday, after the afternoon ceremony and before the midday parade, the following cheer is done by the Corps of Cadets:

 Cadet Corps Commander: "Heroico Colegio Militar" ("Heroic Military College")
 Cadets: Por el Honor de Mexico! (For Mexico's Honor!)

Collegiate Hymn and March

Hymn of the Heroic Military College 

The Hymn of the Heroic Military College was composed in 1930 by Prof. José Ignacio Ríos del Río.

Lyrics
Spanish
Chorus 
Vibre el clarín de la guerra, resuenen las fanfarrias
Redoblen los tambores, una marcha triunfal
Y lleven de la Patria a todos los confines
Tu nombre sacrosanto, 
Colegio Militar
Tu nombre sacrosanto, 
Colegio Militar

Verse
Colegio sacrosanto, de memoria bendita
de forjaran sus almas, Montes de Oca y Melgar
La Patria bate marcha de honor a tu pasado,
de epopeyas gloriosas y de nombre inmortal.

Y en un gesto sublime de amor y de cariño,
bendice a los efebos que supieron morir 
bañados por las ráfagas de luz espendorosa
que el ángel de la gloria enviara del cenit.Repeat Chorus Regimental March of the Heroic Military College 
The Regimental March was composed by Lieutenant José Sotero Ortiz Sánchez, in time for the College's 1947 centenary of the Battle of Chapultepec.

Lyrics

Spanish
Páginas del libro de la historia del Heroico Colegio Militar
de epopeyas que ya jamás se borran del santuario de la inmortalidad.
Canto que se eleva a la memoria como ofrenda de honor a la lealtad 
de los héroes que envueltos por la gloria grandioso ejemplo que nos dio la libertad. Repeat AllJuventud de mi patria sublime, que marcháis con gallarda ilusión 
aumentáreis la historia que escribe nobles hechos de sangre y honor. 
Yunque forjador de hombres de guerra como Suárez, Escutia y Melgar,
Montes de Oca, Márquez y De la Barrera, los niños héroes de mi México inmortal!Repeat All Commandants 

Filming location
The site was used as a location for the 1990 movie Total Recall. The buildings of the academy were used as apartments and a subway entrance.

See also
Military history of Mexico

 References 

HISTORIA INSTITUCIONAL DE LA EDUCACIÓN DEL HEROICO COLEGIO MILITAR DE MÉXICO (1822-1871)

Further reading
Camp, Roderic Ai. Generals in the Palacio: The Military in Modern Mexico. New York: Oxford University Press 1992.
DePalo, William A. Jr. The Mexican National Army, 1822-1852. College Station TX: Texas A&M Press 1997.
Lieuwen, Edwin. Mexican Militarism: The Political Rise and Fall of the Revolutionary Army''. Albuquerque: University of New Mexico Press 1968.

Military academies of Mexico
Educational institutions established in 1823
Education in Mexico City